Thriambeutis coryphaea is a species of moth of the family Heliodinidae.

Distribution
This species is known from the Philippines (Mindoro).

It has a wingspan of 22 mm.

References

Heliodinidae
Moths of the Philippines
Moths described in 1912